The 2022 CAF Awards was held on 21 July 2022 at Mohammed VI Technical Centre in Rabat, the capital city of Morocco.

Player of the Year (Men) 
The shortlist nominees for the award were announced on 11 July 2022.

Player of the Year (Women) 
The shortlist nominees for the award were announced on 14 July 2022.

Interclub Player of the Year (Men)

Interclub Player of the Year (Women)

Young Player of the Year (Men)

Young Player of the Year (Women)

Coach of the Year (Men)

Coach of the Year (Women)

National Team of the Year (Men)

National Team of the Year (Women)

Club of the Year (Men)

Club of the Year (Women)

References 

CAF
2022 in association football
CAF
Confederation of African Football trophies and awards
2022 in African football